Tru Loved is a 2008 independent film written and directed by Stewart Wade and starring Najarra Townsend, Jake Abel, Matthew Thompson and Alexandra Paul.

Plot
Sixteen-year-old Tru has been raised in San Francisco by two lesbian mothers and two gay fathers. When one of her mothers gets a well-paid job in a multi-cultural but more conservative suburb in Southern California, Tru and her mothers relocate.

When Tru first starts at her new school, teachers welcome her but a group of male football jocks and their female friends bully her and say she looks like a "dyke." One of the footballers, Lodell, changes his mind about her and they start dating, but the relationship never becomes sexual. When they attend The Marvelous Wonderettes musical, Lodell flirts with a man. Tru's fathers suggest that Lodell is gay, and when Tru questions him he finally, reluctantly admits that he is a closeted homosexual. She tells him that she "doesn't want to be his Katie Holmes" but agrees to be his beard so he can continue to be accepted at school.

Tru begins to spend time with Lodell's best friend, fellow footballer Manuel, but when he bullies openly gay classmate Walter, Tru defends Walter and they become friends. They try to establish a Gay Straight Alliance and although a conservative teacher and a closeted English teacher refuse to support the group, the school drama teacher agrees to be the faculty sponsor. The first meeting is successful, with several people attending a long discussion on same-sex marriage in California, but during football practice at the same time, the coach calls the players "ladies," rants that "kids can't even say prayers in class, but the fags... get their own club!" He then asks his team if they want to "put a little muscles into these plays or go meet [their] boyfriends at the Gay Scouts of America," to which they answer that they want to "play ball."

At the end of the Gay Straight Alliance meeting Tru meets a gay-rights supporter, hipster-geek senior Trevor. She initially thinks he's gay, but they quickly form an intimate relationship. Raised by his gay fiction-author uncle, Trevor is open-minded about Tru's family arrangement. Later, Tru discovers that Lodell and Walter are sexually involved, and she ends her faux-relationship with Lodell. When Lodell and his teammates destroy a Gay Straight Alliance banner, Trevor sends out a mass coming out e-mail from Lodell's account. Tru is upset by this but eventually forgives him.

Tru's mothers have a small backyard commitment ceremony attended by teachers and other locals. Lodell arrives to announce that he has left another faux-relationship, and he has the opportunity to reconcile with Walter and meet David Kopay. Manuel arrives with his football coach and punches Lodell for not revealing his sexuality. He refuses to accept homosexuality, but promises to continue being a friend to Lodell. Lodell performs a self-penned song, the school principal dances with Trevor's uncle, and the closeted English teacher is advised by friend and fellow teacher Ms. Maple (Jane Lynch) to be open about his sexuality. In the short final scene, Lodell comes out to his mother and grandmother and introduces Walter as his boyfriend.

Cast

Reception
The film premiered at the Sedona Film Festival on 28 February 2008 and at the Frameline Film Festival on 21 June 2008. It received 14 awards at six film festivals. The film went into limited national release on 17 October 2008.

, the film holds a 39% approval rating on Rotten Tomatoes, based on 18 reviews with an average rating of 4.66/10. Kevin Thomas of the Los Angeles Times called the film "engaging, timely and courageous", but the Chicago Reader called it "worthless drivel for the gay-lesbian market". Film critic Roger Ebert caused a controversy when his published review of the film revealed that he had stopped watching after only eight minutes, making it one of only four films he walked out on (the others being Caligula, Jonathan Livingston Seagull, and The Statue). He explained: "At what turned out to be the eight-minute mark, I paused the disc, looked at my notes so far, and thought, 'There's my review right there.' The movie had left me not wanting to see more." He later watched and reviewed the entire film and promised to never again review a film he had not seen "in its entirety. Never. Ever." In his review of the full film, Ebert gave it one star and suggested that the film would be appealing primarily to younger gay teenagers, and that "[t]he actors all have to deal with roles that are under- or over-written, and with characters that are one-dimensional stereotypes (the coach, the grandmother, both gay dad parents)."

References

External links 
 

2008 films
American LGBT-related films
2008 drama films
American teen drama films
Films set in California
2000s English-language films
2000s American films